Ukrainian singer Verka Serduchka (Andrey Danilko) has released four studio albums, seven soundtrack albums, five compilation albums, and two extended plays.

Albums

Studio albums

EPs

Compilation albums

Soundtrack albums

Instrumental albums

Singles

As lead artist

As featured artist

Music videos

References

External links 
 
 
 
 

Discographies of Ukrainian artists
Pop music discographies
Discography